Durham College Rowing  (commonly abbreviated to DCR) represents all sixteen college boat clubs in Durham University, encompassing approximately half of the rowers, scullers and coxes in the region of North East England.

As well as organising trailers to competitions off the River Wear, DCR also organises inter-collegiate events, coaching and launch-driving courses, swim tests, and implement and enforce the regulations as set out by the Durham University Rowing Board.

DCR also provides a forum for college captains to meet and discuss current rowing events, particularly safety issues, with each other and with the executive committee.

The executive committee consists of the captain of colleges, who represents college rowers at a university and regional level, a coaching coordinator, who arranges coaching and launch driving courses, and also a treasurer, secretary and press officer. The regatta secretary sits on the executive committee and also leads the regatta committee, who are responsible for DCR competitions.

Inter-collegiate races

Durham College Rowing organizes several regattas and head races each year.

Novice Cup This was known as the Hatfield cup until 2003 when Durham College Rowing took over the organising of the event.

Senate Cup

Pennant Series

Admirals Regatta

Durham College Rowing is a joint organiser of Durham Regatta together with Durham Amateur Rowing Club, Durham University Boat Club and Durham School Boat Club.

Structure of rowing in Durham University 
Rowers, scullers and coxes in Durham University can usually be categorised as "college rowers" (members of college boat clubs) or "university rowers" (members of Durham University Boat Club).

Durham College Rowing represents the college boat clubs on Durham University Rowing Board (commonly abbreviated to DURB), which oversees all rowing activities by members of Durham University. DURB aims to provide a safe environment in which rowing can take place within Durham University and promote health and safety within the sport at all levels.

Clubs 
The following are the college rowing clubs in Durham on the River Wear, with their blade colours: and British Rowing codes:

Durham University has its own boat club:

References

External links
 Durham College Rowing

Durham University Rowing